The Haifa naval base is a base of Israeli Navy, located in Haifa, Israel, and constitutes the main naval base of the Israel Defense Forces. The base is the hub of Israel's naval force. The naval base has submarines, missile boats and other vessels. On 28 November 2011, Brigadier General Eli Sharvit, was appointed as commander of the Haifa Naval Base.

References

See also 
 Israeli Navy

Israeli Navy
Naval installations
Buildings and structures in Haifa